The Mazda J-family are a range of 60-degree V6 engines featuring a cast-iron cylinder block and alloy heads with belt-driven DOHC or SOHC. It is Mazda's only cast-iron gasoline V6. These engines are found in the Mazda H platform-based Mazda 929, Efini MS-9, and Mazda Luce; as well as the L platform Mazda MPV and S platform Mazda Bongo. It was built at the Miyoshi Plant in Miyoshi, Hiroshima, Japan.

JF
 2.0 L JF - SOHC 12-valve longitudinally mounted V6.

Applications:
 1986-1989 Mazda 929
 1986-1989 Mazda Luce (Japan)

JFT
 2.0 L JFT - a turbocharged variant of the JF engine.

JE

A JE-ZE DOHC variant was in the 1990-1995 Mazda 929 S, producing .

Applications:
 1989-1998 Mazda MPV
 1986-1989 Mazda 929
 1986-1989 Mazda Luce (Japan)
 1990-1994 Mazda 929
 1991-1993 Efini MS-9
 1992-1997 Kia Potentia (South Korea)

J5
The 2.5 L J5-DE is a DOHC motor producing . When used by Kia in South Korea, the J5 engine claimed  at 6,000 rpm.

Applications:
 1990-1994 Mazda 929
 1991-1993 Efini MS-9
Mazda Bongo
 1997-2002 Kia New Potentia (South Korea)

See also
 Mazda engines

J
V6 engines
Gasoline engines by model